Nicanor served as Greek Patriarch of Alexandria between 1866 and 1869.

References
 

19th-century Greek Patriarchs of Alexandria